The Volvo Cross Country Challenge was an unofficial women's professional golf event on the Ladies European Tour. It was held in Spain or Denmark annually between 2005 and 2007. 

The winner of the challenge received a Volvo. The 18-year-old Kiran Matharu from Leeds, England, had yet to learn to drive when she won the Volvo Cross Country Challenge and a brand new Volvo XC70 in 2007.

Participation
To qualify for the tournament, players had to participate in at least three out of four of the LET tournaments hosted in Nordic countries:

  Scandinavian TPC hosted by Annika
  SAS Masters
  Finnair Masters
  Nykredit Masters

Prize money collected in these tournaments were added up in a "Volvo XC Challenge Order-of-Merit". The top 10 on the Order-of-Merit competed for $120,000. 

In addition, players could get $1,000,000 bonus by winning all four of the above tournaments in one season.

Winners

References

Former Ladies European Tour events
Golf tournaments in Denmark
Golf tournaments in Spain
Recurring sporting events established in 2005
Recurring sporting events disestablished in 2007
2005 establishments in Spain
2007 disestablishments in Denmark